Alfonso XII and María Cristina or Where Are You Going, Sad Man? is a 1960 Spanish historical drama film directed by Alfonso Balcázar and Guillermo Cases and starring Vicente Parra and Marga López as Alfonso XII of Spain and Maria Christina of Austria.

The film is the sequel to Where Are You Going, Alfonso XII? with Vicente Parra, José Marco Davó and Tomás Blanco reprising their roles from the previous film as Alfonso XII, Antonio Cánovas del Castillo and the Duque de Sesto respectively.  replaced Mercedes Vecino as Isabella II.

Similar in style to the German Sissi film series, it was very popular but led to Vicente Parra's typecasting.

The film's sets were designed by the art director Enrique Alarcón.

Cast

 Vicente Parra as Alfonso XII
 Marga López as María Cristina 
 José Marco Davó as Antonio Cánovas del Castillo
 Marta Padovan as Infanta Isabel
 Tomás Blanco as Duque de Sesto 
  as Isabella II
 Ana María Custodio as Duquesa de Montpensier
 Francisco Arias
 Rafael Bardem as Doctor Federico Rubio y Galí
 Rosita Yarza 
 Mario Morales
 María Dolores Cabo
 Antonio Jiménez Escribano
 Felip Peña
 Manuel Insúa
 José Sepúlveda as Damián  
 Josefina Serratosa
 José Morales
 Consuelo de Nieva
 Carolina Jiménez
 Mario Bustos
 José Vidal
 Salvador Muñoz
 Mario Beut 
 Rafael Calvo 
 Gonzalo Medel 
 Amalia Sánchez Ariño 
 Ramón Hernández 
 Marta Novar
 Alejo del Peral
 Carmen Aroca
 Juan Eulate as Novaleches  
 Camino Delgado
 Julia Pachelo
 José Cuenca
 Carmen Lozano
 Lolita de Málaga
 Manuel Ausensi 
 Miguel Aguerri

References

Bibliography 
 Mira, Alberto. Historical Dictionary of Spanish Cinema. Scarecrow Press, 2010.

External links 
 

1960 films
1960s historical drama films
Spanish historical drama films
1960s Spanish-language films
Films directed by Alfonso Balcázar
Films set in the 19th century
Alfonso XII of Spain
1960 drama films
1960s Spanish films
Cultural depictions of Isabella II of Spain